The Gambia national football team represents The Gambia in men's international football and is controlled by the Gambia Football Federation. Until 1965, the team and the country were known as British Gambia. The team has never qualified for the World Cup. In 2021, Gambia qualified for the Africa Cup of Nations finals for the first time in history. The team represents both FIFA and Confederation of African Football (CAF).

History
Under the name British Gambia, the team played their first ever game on 9 February 1953 against Sierra Leone, winning 2–1 at home in a friendly. In April 1963, the team entered the L'Amitié tournament in Senegal, a competition mainly for French-speaking nations. They were drawn in a group with France's amateur team, the Upper Volta (now Burkina Faso) and Gabon. Their first match was lost 5–1 to the French amateurs on 11 April. The Gambia drew 2–2 with the Upper Volta on 13 April, and had the same result the very next day versus Gabon. The Gambia did not advance to the next round.

After the tournament in Senegal, the Gambia did not play another match until 16 November 1968, when they travelled to Sierra Leone to play its team in a friendly and lost 2–1. They played again in Sierra Leone in The Gambia's next match on 24 April 1971, and the hosts won 3–1. On 2 May 1971, The Gambia travelled to Guinea for a friendly and lost 4–2. On 14 May 1972, The Gambia returned to Guinea for their first African Games qualifier and lost 8–0 and were knocked out.

In 1975, the Gambia entered its first qualification campaign for the 1976 Summer Olympics in Canada. They were drawn in a qualifier against Guinea, and lost the first leg 1–0 at home on 27 April 1975. The second leg was lost 6–0 in Guinea on 1 June as Guinea advanced 7–0 on aggregate.

In August of that same year, the Gambia entered their first qualification for the African Cup of Nations, with the aim of reaching the 1976 finals in Ethiopia. They were drawn in a two-legged qualifier against Morocco and lost the first leg 3–0 away on 10 August. They lost by the same score in their home leg on 24 August and Morocco advanced 6–0 on aggregate.

After the qualification campaign for the 1976 finals, The Gambia played their first match against a full European side, losing a home friendly 4–1 to Denmark on 30 January 1977.

On 12 October 2002, the team got their biggest ever victory in international competition, a 6–0 victory against Lesotho. 

In May 2014, the Gambia was banned from all CAF competitions for two years after deliberately falsifying players' ages.

The nation's fortunes improved in qualification for the 2019 Africa Cup of Nations. Although they failed to qualify, they took it to the final round of games, including drawing twice with African giants Algeria.

On 13 November, in their first Group D match of 2021 Africa Cup of Nations qualification, Gambia defeated Angola 1–3 in Luanda. This was the Scorpions' first away win in an AFCON or FIFA World Cup qualifier ever, at their 40th attempt. An impressive campaign saw them qualify for their first ever major tournament that year. As the lowest-ranked team in the 2021 Africa Cup of Nations, the Gambia defied the odds by defeating favourites Tunisia in the group stage, finishing unbeaten in 2nd place in the group. A further win against Guinea in the Round of 16 saw them reach the quarter-finals at their first attempt, eventually going out to tournament hosts Cameroon.

Home stadium

Independence Stadium is a multi-purpose stadium in Bakau, Gambia. It is currently used mostly for football matches, although it is also used for music concerts, political events, trade fairs and national celebrations. The stadium holds 30,000 people.

Recent schedule and results

The following is a list of match results from the previous 12 months, as well as any future matches that have been scheduled.

2022

2023

Coaching staff
In July 2018, former Togo and Zimbabwe coach Tom Saintfiet, was appointed as head coach. Saintfiet took over from former international Sang Ndong who is now technical director of the Gambia Football Federation (GFF) following the end of his contract in January.

Coaching history

  Hans Heiniger (1987–1992)
  Sang Ndong (1994–2003)
  Antoine Hey (2006–2007)
  José Martínez (2007–2008)
  Paul Put (2008–2011)
  Peter Bonu Johnson (2011–2012)
  Luciano Mancini (2012–2013)
  Peter Bonu Johnson (2013–2015)
   Raoul Savoy (2015)
  Sang Ndong (2016–2018)
  Tom Saintfiet (2018–present)

Players

Current squad
The following players were called up for the 2023 AFCON qualification matches against Mali on 24 and 28 March 2023.

Caps and goals correct as of 20 November 2022, after the match against .

Recent call ups

The following players have also been called up to the Gambia squad within the last twelve months.

WD Player withdrew from the squad due to non-injury issue.
INJ Player withdrew from the squad due to an injury.
PRE Preliminary squad.
RET Player has retired from international football.
SUS Suspended from the national team.

Records 

Players in bold are still active with Gambia.

Most appearances

Top goalscorer

Competitive record

FIFA World Cup

Africa Cup of Nations

Honours
Amilcar Cabral Cup :
Runners-up (3)

References

External links

  of the Gambian Football Federation

 
African national association football teams
National sports teams established in 1953